The Trafalgar Building is a multi-use building at 108-110 Collins Street in the CBD of Hobart, Tasmania, Australia. It has fifteen stories and is 50 metres tall.

Usage of the building includes general commercial for the first two floors, car parking for levels three to twelve, and corporate offices on floors thirteen through to fifteen.

Current corporate tenants are Tasmanian Ports Corporation Pty Ltd (level 13), The Department of Justice (level 14), and RXP (level 15).

See also 
 List of tallest buildings in Hobart

Buildings and structures in Hobart
Buildings and structures completed in 1987